Þingeyri Airport  is an airport serving Þingeyri (Thingeyri), Iceland.

It was closed for air traffic in 2013 due to winter damage to the runway. The runway has reopened to traffic. It is typically only used as a backup to Ísafjörður airport.

See also
List of airports in Iceland
Transport in Iceland

References

External links
 OurAirports - Iceland
 Þingeyri Airport

Airports in Iceland